Leeuwenhoekiella polynyae  is a Gram-negative, rod-shaped, strictly aerobic and motile bacterium from the genus of Leeuwenhoekiella which has been isolated from water from the polynya in the Antarctic Ocean.

References 

Flavobacteria
Bacteria described in 2015
Leeuwenhoekiella